The SNCF Class Z 7300 electric multiple units were built by Alsthom between 1980 and 1984. They are part of the Z2 family of EMUs. These are Z 7500, Z 9500 and Z 9600.

Gallery 

Z 07300
Alstom multiple units
Electric multiple units of France